The Legend of the Firefish is the first book of the Trophy Chase Trilogy by American author George Bryan Polivka. It was his first novel, published in paperback by Harvest House Publishers.

Setting 
The story takes place in the fictional country of Nearing Vast, in a time of sailing ships, pirates, sea monsters, and swordsmen. The key characters are a young swordsman, Packer Throme, and his love, Panna Throme, whose story is told throughout the trilogy.

Plot summary 
Packer begins a quest to hunt the legendary Firefish by stowing away aboard the Trophy Chase, a pirate ship captained by the notorious Scat Wilkins. His goal is to learn how to capture the Firefish, whose rare meat is extremely valuable, and will bring prosperity back to all Nearing Vast. While he attempts to win his way among pirates, Panna Seline determines to follow him. The trials of Packer at sea and Panna on shore are told in interweaving fashion.

Spiritual components 
Packer was originally called to the priesthood, but failed in seminary. Panna is the daughter of the local priest, who is bitterly disappointed in Packer. Packer's conscience is tried as he attempts to reconcile his original calling, and the teachings of Jesus to “turn the other cheek,” with his swordsmanship. He wants to bring prosperity to Nearing Vast, but do the means justify the end? The storylines also feature the power of prayer, and the motivations of faith.

References 

 FictionDB http://www.fictiondb.com/author/george-bryan-polivka~41957.htm
 Christy Awards https://web.archive.org/web/20120124031909/http://www.christyawards.com/ca_new/images/stories/client_pdf/00-10_WinnersFinalists.pdf
 Publishers Weekly http://www.publishersweekly.com/978-0-7369-1956-2
 Publisher's Marketplace https://web.archive.org/web/20150903194727/http://www.publishersmarketplace.com/members/Bookman/
 WorldNews Network http://article.wn.com/view/2011/03/08/Trophy_Chase_Trilogy_by_George_Bryan_Polivka/
 News Release Today http://www.newreleasetoday.com/bookdetail.php?book_id=2126

American fantasy novels